Bank Hall or Bankhall may refer to:

Bank Hall, a Jacobean manor in Bretherton, Lancashire, United Kingdom
Bank Hall Estate, the estate belonging to the above
Bank Hall Gardens, the immediate grounds belonging to the above
Bank Hall Action Group, a charity looking after the above
Bank Hall, the original name for Warrington Town Hall in Warrington, United Kingdom
Bank Hall Colliery a coal mine in Burnley, Lancashire.
Bank Hall railway station, a station serving the Kirkdale area of Liverpool, United Kingdom
Bankhall Villa AFC, a defunct football team from Chapelhall, North Lanarkshire, United Kingdom

Architectural disambiguation pages